The Letsche Elementary School (also known as Letsche Alternative Learning Center and Letsche Education Center) located in the Crawford–Roberts neighborhood of  in Pittsburgh, Pennsylvania is a building from 1905. It was listed on the National Register of Historic Places in 1986.

References

Neoclassical architecture in Pennsylvania
Art Deco architecture in Pennsylvania
School buildings completed in 1905
Schools in Pittsburgh
School buildings on the National Register of Historic Places in Pennsylvania
Pittsburgh History & Landmarks Foundation Historic Landmarks
National Register of Historic Places in Pittsburgh
1905 establishments in Pennsylvania